This list is of the Places of Scenic Beauty of Japan located within the Prefecture of Niigata.

National Places of Scenic Beauty
As of 1 December 2020, twelve Places have been designated at a national level.

Prefectural Places of Scenic Beauty
As of 1 May 2020, three Places have been designated at a prefectural level.

Municipal Places of Scenic Beauty
As of 1 May 2020, sixteen Places have been designated at a municipal level.

Registered Places of Scenic Beauty
As of 1 December 2020, one Monument has been registered (as opposed to designated) as a Place of Scenic Beauty at a national level.

See also
 Cultural Properties of Japan
 List of parks and gardens of Niigata Prefecture
 List of Historic Sites of Japan (Niigata)

References

External links
  Cultural Properties in Niigata Prefecture

Tourist attractions in Niigata Prefecture
Places of Scenic Beauty